Group 8 was a feminist organization in Sweden, founded by eight women in Stockholm in 1968. The organization took up various feminist issues such as: demands for expansions of kindergartens, 6-hour working day, equal pay for equal work and opposition to pornography. Initially the organization was based in Stockholm, but later local groups were founded throughout the country. Although Group 8 dissolved in the early 2000s, their influence on feminism in Sweden is still prevalent.

Origin 
The eight original founders of the organization in 1968 were Barbro Back Berger, Birgitta Bolinder, Gunnel Granlid, Birgitta Svanberg, Greta Sörlin, Ulla Torpe, Anita Theorell and Åsa Åkerstedt. A Swedish literary scholar and member of the Women's Literature Project at Uppsala University, Karin Westman Berg, held a gender conference circa 1967 in which the Group 8 founders attended. It was at this conference where the 8 women first met.

By 1970 the group had increased to 16 members, all operating under the slogan "The private is political," which was intended to give recognition to women's struggles. Only four years after Group 8 appeared in Stockholm, forty-three Group 8's surfaced with about ten members each. A larger Group 8, with roughly thirty-five members, eventually materialized in another Swedish city - Malmö.

Feminist Equality Comparison 
Other U.S. and European countries had their own ways of going about establishing feminist equality in the '60s and '70s. In the United States, the feminist movement in the 1960s focused on, among other things, inequality in the workplace. Only 38% of women held jobs, and these jobs were limited to teachers, nurses, and secretaries. During this period, most white women were college educated, and felt irritated that they were confined to the house. A group of women, including Betty Friedan, decided to found an organization to fight this gender discrimination called the National Organization for Women (NOW). American feminists have inserted themselves in state, local, and national levels of politics since the 1960s. In Britain, feminists played more of a secondary role. Britain has a centralized, closed system and lacks policy networks. Both Americans and the British have developed opposition towards feminist groups and lessened their abilities to initiate political policies.

In contrast to the U.S. and Britain, Swedish feminist have achieved many of their goals in regards to women's equality. Although Sweden's approach was not very effective, they still played a very significant role in establishing nondiscrimination policies. Women in Sweden began liberating themselves from their patriarchal society as early as the 17th century. They were permitted to attend school, conduct business in their own names, and gained equal inheritance rights. Although they had made some progress, Swedish women still had many obstacles in their way preventing them from reaching full equality. It wasn't until 1968 that Group 8 was created.

Group 8, a militant, feminist movement in Sweden took up various issues, such as demands for expansions of kindergartens, a 6-hour work day, equal pay for equal work, and opposition to pornography. Initially the organization was based in Stockholm, but later local groups were founded throughout the country. Group 8 consisted of about 1,000 members but had no true leader. The women of Group 8 created a sense of political activism through the use of media. They made sure female feminist columnists and writers were hired by the two major newspapers in Sweden, allowing for a feminist voice to be heard by just about everyone. The group also sponsored housing set aside solely for women in order to help protect, strengthen, and empower the female population. Unfortunately, Group 8 never became a consistently strong organization because they were more focused on class than on gender. Group 8's impact and efforts towards equality have since died down a lot. Although Group 8 no longer holds a significant position in the feminist movement, it still publishes an issue of their magazine, "Kvinnobulletinen", every month. "Kvinnobulletinen", also known as "Women's Bulletin," was started by Gunilla Thorgren, who was the chief editor from 1970 to 1975. The magazine was first released in 1970 and covered various feminist issues such as prostitution, unionism, women in the workplace, heterosexuality, and homosexuality.

Swedish Political Structure  
As a liberal democracy, the Swedish system typically has little opposition to framework and rules for the resolution of conflict. The local government gives power to executive committees to govern at a community level. This distinguishes Swedish politics as well as their low level of political activism, with the exception of voting. Swedish officials are typically suspicious of women's groups that do exist in Sweden; this is primarily due to the structure of the women's organizations being more traditional rather than "liberationists.". Because the government model emphasizes consensus, minorities typically have difficulty developing and implementing movements for their cause.

However, in 2005, a feminist political party (Feminist Initiative) was formed and eventually announced it would nominate candidates for elections in the future. This political party, originally influenced by Group 8 and similar organizations, acquired an impressive 2500 members.

Influence
In 1971, the group relaunched International Women's Day manifestations and also started publishing Kvinnobulletinen.

By April 8, 1972, the exhibition Women was compiled by Group 8 in the Modern Museum (in Swedish) - a modern art museum in Stockholm. Later, in the same year, Group 8 is attributed to a reversal conducted by the Minister of Finance, Gunnar Sträng. They had three very clear demands: women's right to work, daycare, and education.

In 1973 a section that felt that more emphasis needed to be given to the class struggle broke away and formed Women of Labor (in Swedish: Arbetets kvinnor).

After making valuable contributions to Swedish societal issues, Group 8's importance to feminism in Sweden declined towards the end of the 70's. In Sweden, some of the largest beneficiaries of Group 8's impact include the National Organization for Women's and Girls' Shelters in Sweden (ROKS) and the Feminist Initiative.

References 

Feminist organizations in Sweden
1960s establishments in Sweden
Anti-pornography feminism
Defunct organizations based in Sweden
History of Stockholm
Political history of Sweden
Organizations established in 1968
Socialist feminist organizations
20th century in Stockholm
Defunct women's organizations
1968 in women's history
Second-wave feminism
Women in Stockholm
History of women in Sweden